Ghulam Hamdani (1751–1844), known by the takhallus (nom de plume) of Mas'hafi (مصحفی maṣḥafi), was an Urdu ghazal poet.

Works

Before his time, the language known as Hindi, Hindavi, Dehlavi, Dakhini, Lahori or Rekhta was commonly known as the Zaban-i-Ordu, and commonly in local literature and speech, Lashkari Zaban or Lashkari. Mashafi was the first person to simply shorten the latter name to Urdu. He migrated to Lucknow during the reign of Asaf-ud-Daula. According to one source, his ghazals are full of pathos.

He wrote Tazkira E Hindi in Persian language which demonstrates his skill in that tongue. He also wrote in Hindavi aka. Hindi poetry:

There are ten extant collections of his poems, but it is believed that he allowed others for a fee to publish his poems under their own authorship. His personal life lacked discipline and his poetry reflects a level of sensuality. He excelled in lyrics but also composed odes and romances.

See also
List of Urdu poets
Rekhta
Ghazal

References

Mughal Empire poets
Urdu-language poets from India
1750 births
1824 deaths
People from Akbarpur, Ambedkar Nagar
Writers from Lucknow
18th-century Indian poets
19th-century Indian poets
Poets from Uttar Pradesh